Aleksandr Sergeyevich Guteyev (born 18 June 1967) is a Russian professional football coach and a former player. He is the goalkeepers' coach with FC Khimki.

Playing career
As a player, he made his debut in the Soviet Top League in 1990 for PFC CSKA Moscow.

Honours
 Soviet Top League champion: 1991.
 Soviet Top League runner-up: 1990.
 Soviet Cup winner: 1991.
 Soviet Cup finalist: 1992.
 Russian Cup finalist: 1993, 1994.

European club competitions
 UEFA Champions League 1992–93 with PFC CSKA Moscow: 3 games.
 UEFA Intertoto Cup 1998 with FC Shinnik Yaroslavl: 1 game.

References

1967 births
Footballers from Moscow
Living people
Soviet footballers
Russian footballers
Soviet Top League players
Russian Premier League players
PFC CSKA Moscow players
FC Kuban Krasnodar players
FC Shinnik Yaroslavl players
Association football goalkeepers
FC Torpedo Moscow players